St Helena: a play in twelve scenes is a play by the English author R. C. Sherriff (notable as the author of the First World War drama Journey's End) and Jeanne de Casalis (who also researched it). It deals with the exile of Napoleon I on Saint Helena. In a production by Henry Cass, it premiered at the Old Vic on 4 February 1936 to poor reviews, but was rescued by a letter to The Times by Winston Churchill, calling it "a remarkable play" and "a work of art of a very high order"; though a West End transfer also proved unsuccessful.

Original cast
General Count Bertrand - Ion Swinley
General Count Montholon - Leo Genn
General Baron Gourgaud - Clement McCallin
Napoleon - Kenneth Kent
Admiral Sir George Cockburn - Raymond Huntley
Captain Nicholls - Robert Craven
Count Las Cases - Alan Wheatley
Sir Hudson Lowe - Cecil Trouncer
Dr. O'Meara - William Devlin
Dr. Antommarchi, Ship's Carpenter - Alec Clunes
Marine - Eric Wynn-Owen
St. Denis - Anthony Quayle
Marchand - Richard Warner
Cipriani - Alwyn Whatsley
French Servants - Phillip BowenDenis Carew
English Sailors - John FranklynJohn Jameson
Novarrez - George Woodbridge
Officer, Trooper - Guy Haslewood
Subaltern - John Franklyn
Napoleon Bertrand - Tony Wickham
Tristan - Eric Sutton
Abe Buonavita - Charles Doe
Abbe Vignali - Christopher Casson
Chinese Gardeners - Alan FossJohn KennedyJohn Jameson
Countess Montholon - Vivienne Bennett
Countess Bertrand - Ursula Granville
Hortense Bertrand - Glynis Johns
Mulatto Maid - Fredericka Allen

Broadway production
The play opened at Broadway's Lyceum Theatre in October 1936, with Maurice Evans as Napoleon, and ran for 63 performances.

Adaptation
St Helena was presented as the February 27, 1949, episode of The Philco Television Playhouse on NBC. The trade publication Variety described Dennis King's portrayal of Napoleon as "an admirable characterization".

Sources
R. C. Sherriff, No Leading Lady (London: Victor Gollancz Ltd, 1968), pages 297 to 308
A New Play About Napoleon  - The Times, Thursday, Jan 30, 1936; pg. 12;

References

External links
 
Openlibrary.org
1953 Broadcast of condensed version of play performed for Best Plays at Internet Archive

1936 plays
Plays by R. C. Sherriff
West End plays
Broadway plays
Plays about Napoleon